Pars Oil Company is an oil refining  company with headquarters in Tehran.

History and development
Pars Oil Company was founded in 1959 as a joint-stock company by Abdol-Ali Mirza Farmanfarmaian and some of his relatives, later adding more stock holders. It was admitted to the Tehran Stock Exchange in 1962. After the Islamic Revolution of 1979, the company was ceased by the revolutionary government and passed on to the control of the Mostazafen Foundation of Islamic Revolution, a government owned umbrella group set up as part of the nationalisation efforts of the new government. In the 1990s, some of the stocks were returned to former stock holders.  In 2000, Foad Rey purchased 48.7 percent of Pars Oil Company stocks.

Products
The company's main product are gasoline engine oils, diesel engine oils, automotive gear oils, industrial oils, antifreezes, brake fluids, greases and marine oils.

Certifications
Pars Oil Company has qualified for ISO 9001 from SGS Industrial Services, as well as many other health, safety, and environment certificates including ISO 14001 and OHSAS 18001.

Export markets
Pars Oil Company started to export its products in 1994. The current export markets are India, China, some African and European countries.

See also

Industry of Iran
Privatization in Iran
List of Iranian companies
National Iranian Oil Company

References

External links
 http://www.lubricants1.com/news/lubricant-news/january-2010/item-7599.html
 https://web.archive.org/web/20160304064401/http://companies.globalmarket.com/pars-oil-co-246893.html

Oil and gas companies of Iran
Non-renewable resource companies established in 1959
Companies listed on the Tehran Stock Exchange
Oil refineries in Iran
Iranian brands
Iranian companies established in 1959
Iranian entities subject to the U.S. Department of the Treasury sanctions